Archambault Ridge is a ridge which descends from the Deep Freeze Range to Campbell Glacier between Rainey Glacier and Recoil Glacier in the Southern Cross Mountains of Victoria Land. It was mapped by the United States Geological Survey from surveys and from U.S. Navy air photos, 1960–64, and named by the Advisory Committee on Antarctic Names for Lieutenant John L. Archambault, U.S. Navy, medical officer at McMurdo Station, 1967.

References
 

Ridges of Victoria Land
Borchgrevink Coast